Sanggye Station is a station on Line 4 of the Seoul Metropolitan Subway network in Nowon-gu, Seoul. It is named after the upper valley of the Suraksan mountain nearby.

The station has 4 exits and is also connected with Daeho Department Store. The name of the subway station comes from its local name. The local name is the name of a nearby river.

Station layout

References 

Metro stations in Nowon District
Seoul Metropolitan Subway stations
Railway stations in South Korea opened in 1985